Alice in Wonderland is a 2005 Indian Malayalam-language film directed by Sibi Malayil. It stars Jayaram and Sandhya as brother and sister duo. The music is scored by Vidyasagar. Despite the name, the plot bears no reference or resemblance to the Lewis Carroll book Alice's Adventures in Wonderland.

Plot
Alby's sister Alice is mentally challenged. He adores her and dotes on her. Into their life comes Victor, a young magician. His loving nature attracts Alice. Alby feels this intrusion and relations become strained between the brother and sister. Sophia, a research student from Singapore, wants to prepare a thesis on orphanages. She and Alby become friends. Soon Alby becomes attracted to her and this creates tension in her mind. They must come to terms with each other's need for companionship in their life.

Cast
Jayaram as Alby
Kadhal Sandhya as Alby's sister Alice
Vineeth as Victor Joseph and Sundher
Jagathy Sreekumar as Fr. Stephen
Sukumari as Grandma
Baiju Santhosh as Lonappan
Jyothirmayi as Dr. Sunitha 
Laya as Sophie Oommen
Janardhanan as Mani Kuruvila, ex-military
Kulappully Leela as Martha, housekeeper
Baby Rehana as Chakky

Soundtrack

References

External links

2005 films
2000s Malayalam-language films
Films scored by Vidyasagar
Films directed by Sibi Malayil